This is a list of compositions by the Cuban composer and guitarist Leo Brouwer. Given the prominence of the instrument in Brouwer's oeuvre, his works for guitar solo, guitar ensembles, as well as guitar concertos, are all placed in a separate category. However, pieces which include guitar as part of a mixed ensemble, and ones for guitar and tape, are placed into the chamber music category.

Works for guitar

Solo guitar

 1955 Suite No. 1 Antigua
 1955 Suite No. 2
 1956 Preludio
 1957 Danza Característica "Quítate de la Acera"
 1956 Dos temas populares cubanos 
 Canción de cuna (Berceuse), after Drume negrita by Emilio Grenet
 Ojos Brujos, after a criolla by Gonzalo Roig
 1956 Piezas sin títulos I–II
 1959 Fuga No. 1
 1959 Tres Apuntes
 1962 Dos aires populares cubanos
 Guajira criolla
 Zapateo cubano (Zapateado)
 1962 Pieza sin título III
 1962 Tres piezas latinoamericanas
 Danza del Altiplano
 Canción Triste (after Carlos Guastavino)
 Tango (after Astor Piazzolla)
 1964 Elogio de la Danza
 1968 Canticum
 Eclosion
 Ditirambo
 1968 Un Dia de Noviembre
 1971 La Espiral Eterna
 1972 Estudios Sencillos (Nos. 1–10)
 1973 Parábola
 1974 Tarantos
 1975 Cadences
 1981 El Decamerón Negro (Dedicated to Sharon Isbin)
 1981 Preludios Epigramáticos No. 1–6
 1983 Estudios Sencillos (Nos. 11–20)
 1984 Variations on a Theme of Django Reinhardt
 1986 Paisaje Cubano con Campanas
 1990 Sonata (dedicated to Julian Bream)
• Fandangos y boleros
• Sarabanda de Scriabin
• Toccata de Pasquini
 1993 Rito de los Orishás
 1996 Hika: In Memoriam Toru Takemitsu
 1996 Hoja de album
 1996 Paisaje Cubano con Tristeza
 1999 An Idea (Passacaglia por Eli)
 2000 Viaje a la Semilla
 2001 Nuevos Estudios Sencillos No. 1–10
 2004 La Ciudad De Las Columnas (Variaciones sobre "Pieza sin Título Nº1")
 2007 Cantilena de los bosques (dedicated to Roberto Fabbri)
 2007 Paisaje Cubano con Fiesta 2007 Variaciones Sobre un Tema de Víctor Jara 2007 Sonata del Caminante (Dedicated to Odair Assad)
 2012 Sonata del Decamerón Negro (Dedicated to Kostas Kotsiolis)
 2013 Sonata Ars Combinatoria 2013 Sonata del Pensador (dedicated to Ricardo Gallén)
 2018 Danza de Medianoche (dedicated to Virginia Luque)
 2019 Los Guardianes de la Magia (dedicated to João Luiz Rezende)
 2020 To the Man in the Mirror (dedicated to Keith Calmes)

Guitar duo
 1957–58 Micro piezas I–IV – Hommage à Darius Milhaud 1958 Micropieza V 1958 Tríptico 1973 Per Suonare a Due 1978 Música incidental campesina 2009 Sonata de Los ViajerosBeatlerianas for 2 guitars
 2018 El Libro de los Seres Imaginarios (Dedicated to Newman & Oltman Guitar Duo)

Guitar quartet

 Canciones remotas Toccata para cuatro o más guitarras Toccata Paisaje Cubano Con Rumba (1985) Paisaje Cubano con lluvia (1984)  Acerca del Cielo, el Aire y la Sonrisa (guitar quartet/guitar orchestra)
 Concerto Grosso  Concerto de Tricastin  Irish Landscape with Rain (2020)Guitar and string quartet
 1958 Quintet for guitar and string quartetGuitar & orchestra

 1958 Tres danzas concertantes 1979 Acerca del cielo, el aire y la sonrisa 1983 Retrats Catalans 1985 From Yesterday to Penny Lane 1995 Concierto Omaggio a Paganini (concerto for guitar and violin)

Guitar concertos
 1972 Concierto num. 1 1981 Concierto num. 2 "de Lieja" 1986 Concierto num. 3 "Elegiaco" 1987 Concierto num. 4 "de Toronto" 1991–92 Concierto num. 5 "de Helsinki" 1997 Concierto num. 6 "de Volos" 1998 Concierto num. 7 "de La Habana" 1999 Concierto num. 8 "Concierto Cantata de Perugia" (for chorus, guitar, and orchestra)
 2002 Concierto num. 9 "de Benicassim" 2003 Concierto num. 10 "Book of Signs" (for two guitars)
 2007 Concierto num. 11 "de Requiem (In memoriam Toru Takemitsu)" 2016 Concierto num. 12 "Austral"Other works
Orchestral
 1964 Sonograma II 1965 Arioso (Homenaje a Charles Mingus), for jazz combo and orchestra
 1967 Tropos 1967–69 La tradición se rompe..., pero cuesta trabajo 1970 Exaedros III, for percussionist and 2 orchestral groups
 1972 Balada, concierto para flauta y orquesta de cuerdas, for flute and orchestra)
 1972 Concierto para violín y orquesta, for violin and orchestra
 1972 Controversia (Sonograma IV) 1972 El gran zoo (Guillén), for narrator, horn solo, and orchestra
 1964 Sonograma IV, for two orchestral groups
 1977 Anima Latina (Madrigali guerrieri ed amorosi) 1979–81 Canción de gesta, for percussion and wind orchestra
 1983 La guerra de las galaxias, orchestral suite on themes by John Williams
 1984 Canciones remotas, for string orchestra
 1992 Wagneriana, for string orchestra
 1996 Lamento por Rafael Orozco, for clarinet and string orchestra

Vocal
 1960 Elegía a Jesús Menéndez, for chorus and orchestra
 1961 Son Mercedes, for mixed chorus
 1964 Canciones Amatorias, for mixed chorus
 1969 Cantigas del tiempo nuevo, for children's chorus, actors, and ensemble
 1970 Cantos yorubá, for baritone, flute, cello, percussion, and piano
 1973 Es el Amor quien ve..., for high voice and ensemble
 1975 Cantata de Chile, for male chorus and orchestra

Chamber and solo instrumental
Piano trios
 1983 Manuscrito antiguo encontrado en una botella 1992 Sonata, sones y danzones 2000–2007 Cuadros de otra exposición 2007 El triángulo de las Bermudas 2011 El Oráculo de IfáString quartets
 1961 Cuarteto de cuerdas num. 1 – a la memoria de Bela Bártok 1968 Cuarteto de cuerdas num. 2 – Rem tene verba sequentur 1991–97 Cuarteto de cuerdas num. 3Other chamber
 1957 Finale, for guitar and string quartet
 1957 Homenaje a Manuel de Falla, for flute, oboe, clarinet, and guitar
 1959 Dos bocetos, for piano solo
 1959 Música, ballet scene for dancer, guitar, piano, and percussion
 1960 Fuga cervantina, for piano solo
 1960/1994 Sonata para cello solo 1961 Fanfarria de celebración, for flute solo
 1962 Variantes, for a percussionist
 1963 Sonograma I, for prepared piano
 1964 Trio No. 2, for oboe, clarinet, and bassoon
 1965 Dos Conceptos del Tiempo, for ensemble
 1966 Conmutaciones, for percussion (2 players) and prepared piano
 1968 El reino de este mundo, for wind quintet
 1968 Epigramas, for violin and piano (or cello and piano)
 1969 Exaedros I–II, for 6 instruments or any multiple of 6 instruments
 1970 Per suonare a Tre, for flute, viola, and guitar
 1970 Sonata piane forte, for piano and tape
 1970 Varias maneras de hacer música con papel, for three or four groups of musicians
 1972 Basso Continuo I, for clarinet and tape, or 2 clarinets
 1972 Ludus metalicus, for saxophone quartet
 1974 Metáforas del amor, for guitar and tape
 1974 Música para tres pianos, for three pianos
 1974 Oda a la alegría, for guitar, piano, and percussion
 1980 Sonograma III, for two pianos
 1982 La región más transparente, for flute and piano
 1985 Los negros brujos se divierten, for ensemble
 1989 Paisaje cubano con ritual, for bass clarinet and percussion
 1990 Divertimento (minuetto mozartiano), for two flutes, timpani, and strings
 1997 Paisajes, retratos y mujeres, for flute, viola, and guitar
 1999 La Vida Misma, for piano, violin, cello, and percussion
 1999 Los pasos perdidos, for double bass and percussion
 2009 Mitología de las Aguas (Sonata No. 1 for flute and guitar)
 2011 Sonata para BandurriaFilm scores
 1960: Historias de la revolución 1965: Vaqueros del cauto 1966: Papeles son papeles 1966: La muerte de un burócrata 1967: Las aventuras de Juan Quin Quin 1968: LBJ 1968: Hanoi, martes 13 1968: Memorias del subdesarrollo 1968: Lucía 1969: Despegue a las 18:00 1971: La bataille des dix millions 1972: Una pelea cubana contra los demonios 1973: El extraño caso de Rachel K 1973: El hombre de Maisinicú 1975: Abril de Vietnam en el año del gato 1975: Ustedes tienen la palabra 1976: Un día de noviembre 1976: La cantata de Chile 1976: La última cena 1977: Mi hermano Fidel 1977: Destino manifiesto 1978: Son o no son 1978: El recurso del método 1979: No hay sábado sin sol 1979: The survivors (Los sobrevivientes) 1979: La viuda de Montiel 1980: La guerra necesaria 1982: Una y otra vez 1983: Tiempo de amar 1983: Los refugiados de la cueva del muerto 1983: Alsino y el cóndor 1983: La rosa de los vientos 1983: Cecilia 1983: Hasta cierto punto 1984: La segunda hora de Esteban Zayas 1985: Cuando una mujer no duerme 1985: Wild Dogs (Jíbaro) 1985: Amada – a woman from Havanna 1986: Tiempo de morir 1992: Like Water for Chocolate (film) 1995: Un héroe se hace a patadas 1998: Mátame mucho 2002: Ficción sin ficción 2003: Memorias de Lucía 2004: Lucía y el tiempo 2004: La persistencia de la memoria 2005: Kordavision''

Brouwer, Leo